Cazadero (Spanish for "hunting ground")  is an unincorporated community and census-designated place (CDP) in western Sonoma County, California, United States with a population of 354 in 2010.  The downtown of Cazadero consists of two churches, a general store, a post office, a hardware store, an auto repair garage, private office space, and the Cazadero Volunteer Fire Department.

Cazadero is the general area from the confluence of Austin Creek and the Russian River at the intersection of California State Route 116 and Cazadero Highway running north to the small town of the same name. Cazadero Highway parallels Austin Creek, which is a principal tributary of the lower Russian River. Located in the Sonoma Coast AVA, Cazadero can also be considered part of Wine Country.

History

Cazadero was the northern terminus of the North Pacific Coast Railroad, originally laid as narrow-gauge track in the 1870s.  This railhead was fed by several smaller-gauge systems dedicated to logging and networks of logging roads and trails which brought trees to Duncans Mill for processing and shipment south to San Francisco.  Local legend holds that much of San Francisco was rebuilt after the disastrous April 1906 earthquake and fire using redwood and other lumber from the Cazadero area.  Cazadero timbers are also known to have been used in pilings sunk to support the old eastern span of the San Francisco-Oakland Bay Bridge (which was replaced by a new span in 2013; the old eastern span was subsequently demolished.)

Geography
Many creeks in Cazadero join Austin Creek as it makes its way to the Russian River. The principal tributary in the area is Kidd Creek, which finds its source on the south east slopes of Pole Mountain which rises to approximately  just a few miles from the Pacific coastline. The rapid rise in elevation from the coast to mountains west of Cazadero ensures that the area receives substantial rainfall as Pacific storms come onshore in spring and winter, releasing rain from clouds saturated with ocean moisture.

Climate
This region includes both coastal cool and coastal warm microclimates. Coastal cool has summer highs in the 70s °F, and winter lows in the 40s °F. Coastal warm has summer highs in the 80s and 90s °F.

Demographics

The 2010 United States Census reported that Cazadero had a population of 354. The racial makeup of Cazadero was 318 (89.8%) White, 1 (0.3%) African American, 7 (2.0%) Native American, 5 (1.4%) Asian, 0 (0.0%) Pacific Islander, 5 (1.4%) from other races, and 18 (5.1%) from two or more races. Hispanic or Latino of any race were 23 persons (6.5%).

The Census reported that 100% of the population lived in households.

There were 164 households, out of which 37 (22.6%) had children under the age of 18 living in them, 71 (43.3%) were opposite-sex married couples living together, 12 (7.3%) had a female householder with no husband present, 6 (3.7%) had a male householder with no wife present.  There were 18 (11.0%) unmarried opposite-sex partnerships, and 5 (3.0%) same-sex married couples or partnerships. 49 households (29.9%) were made up of individuals, and 15 (9.1%) had someone living alone who was 65 years of age or older. The average household size was 2.16.  There were 89 families (54.3% of all households); the average family size was 2.75.

The population was spread out, with 60 people (16.9%) under the age of 18, 20 people (5.6%) aged 18 to 24, 83 people (23.4%) aged 25 to 44, 142 people (40.1%) aged 45 to 64, and 49 people (13.8%) who were 65 years of age or older.  The median age was 46.7 years. For every 100 females, there were 122.6 males.  For every 100 females age 18 and over, there were 117.8 males.

The homeowner vacancy rate was 1.8%; the rental vacancy rate was 9.2%. 67.8% of the population lived in owner-occupied housing units and 32.2% lived in rental housing units.

Parks and recreation
The area is home to a number of camps, including BSA Camp Royaneh, Camp Cazadero, and the Cazadero Performing Arts Camp.

References

Census-designated places in Sonoma County, California
Unincorporated communities in California
Census-designated places in California
Unincorporated communities in Sonoma County, California